Robert Daniel Clampett Jr. (born April 22, 1960) is an American television golf analyst, golf course architect, writer, and professional golfer, who played on the PGA Tour from 1980 to 1995. Clampett began playing on the Champions Tour in April 2010.

College and amateur standout
Clampett was born in Monterey, California. He attended Stevenson School in Pebble Beach, California. He based his early golf training on the book "The Golfing Machine," by Homer Kelley, and he worked closely with golf instructor Ben Doyle, the first authorized instructor of the Golfing Machine. From 1978 to 1980, he was a three-time All-American and two-time Collegiate Golfer of the Year at Brigham Young University. His important amateur titles included the Porter Cup, the Sunnehanna Amateur, and the Western Amateur. He also won the 1978 World Amateur medal, in team competition for the Eisenhower Trophy and the 1978 and 1980 California State Amateurs. He was the low amateur at the 1978 U.S. Open and 1979 Masters.

Professional highlights
Clampett turned professional after the 1980 U.S. Open. From 1980 to 1995, he played on the PGA Tour. He won only one tournament, the 1982 Southern Open. He had almost three dozen top-10 finishes in his career, including nine 2nd or 3rd-place finishes, and had over $1 million in career earnings. His best finish in a major was a T-3 at the 1982 U.S. Open. He was a member of the 1982 World Cup team.

Clampett won an event on the Japan Golf Tour in 1981. He finished 2nd at the 1983 Air New Zealand Shell Open, an official event on the Australasian Tour. He recorded three runner-up finishes in a four year stretch at the Italian Open in the early 1980s. At the 1982 Open Championship played at Royal Troon in Scotland. Clampett opened with rounds of 67 and 66 and held a five shot lead going into Saturday's play. His lead had increased two shots by the fifth hole. Then Clampett drove the ball into a pot bunker at the sixth hole. It took him three shots to get out. This sparked the beginning of a precipitous collapse by Clampett that saw him finish with rounds of 78 and 77 and finish in a tie for 10th.

Like his play at the Open Championship, Clampett's career precipitously declined after the 1982 season. After recording a victory and nine top-3 finishes in his first two seasons as a pro Clampett abruptly changed his swing with devastating results. He would record only two top-3 finishes for the remainder of his career and would never win again.

He did notably, in the 2000 U.S. Open at Pebble Beach – his first event in 21 months – shoot 68 in the opening round, which tied him  for fourth with Hale Irwin and Loren Roberts, three shots behind eventual runaway winner Tiger Woods. Clampett admitted in interviews to being emotional because of how well his opening round went, and although he did not shoot better than 76 the rest of the tournament and tied for 37th, he still enjoyed a warm reception from crowds throughout.

During his 40s, Clampett competed periodically on the Nationwide Tour, and qualified into a PGA Tour event in November 2008. He became eligible for the Champions Tour after reaching age 50 in April 2010.  On May 14, 2010, he tied for the first round lead in his second tournament on that tour.

Broadcaster, author, designer
Clampett joined CBS Sports as an on-course reporter for the 1991 PGA Championship, and joined CBS Sports full-time as a tower announcer in 1995.  Clampett remained stationed at the 15th hole during CBS telecasts until 2006. In 2007, he was replaced by Ian Baker-Finch, coming over from ABC Sports. Clampett continued to work online webcasts streamed by CBS at the major championships and on CBS Sports Network.

He was also the lead golf analyst for Turner Sports from 1996–2007.

Clampett and Andy Brumer co-authored the book "The Impact Zone: Mastering Golf's Moment of Truth", published in late 2007. Clampett has become involved in golf course design in recent years.

Clampett lives in Bonita Springs, Florida with his second wife, Marianna. He has three children from his first marriage: Katelyn, Daniel, and Michael Clampett; and Marianna has two of her own: Nicholas and Anna Suciu.

Controversy
On April 11, 2008, Clampett apologized for referring to golfer Liang Wenchong as "the Chinaman" during the Masters Tournament at Augusta National Golf Club. Clampett, working the Internet broadcast of Amen Corner, made the comment after Liang missed the cut. According to the St. Louis Post-Dispatch, Clampett was taken off the broadcast after the comment.

Amateur wins (6)
1978 California State Amateur, Western Amateur, Porter Cup, Western Junior
1980 California State Amateur, Sunnehanna Amateur

Professional wins (3)

PGA Tour wins (1)

PGA Tour playoff record (0–2)

Japan Golf Tour wins (1)

Other wins (1)

Other playoff record (0–1)

Playoff record
European Tour playoff record (0–1)

Results in major championships

LA = Low amateur
CUT = missed the half-way cut
"T" indicates a tie for a place

Summary

Most consecutive cuts made – 5 (1980 Masters – 1982 Open Championship)
Longest streak of top-10s – 2

U.S. national team appearances
Amateur
Eisenhower Trophy: 1978 (team winners and individual leader)

Professional
World Cup: 1982

See also
1990 PGA Tour Qualifying School graduates

References

External links

American male golfers
BYU Cougars men's golfers
PGA Tour golfers
PGA Tour Champions golfers
Golf writers and broadcasters
Golf course architects
Golfers from California
Golfers from Raleigh, North Carolina
Sportspeople from Monterey, California
People from Bonita Springs, Florida
1960 births
Living people